Radio Central is a public radio station in Cape Coast, the capital town of the Central of Ghana. The station is owned and run by the state broadcaster - the Ghana Broadcasting Corporation.

References

Radio stations in Ghana
Central Region (Ghana)
Mass media in Cape Coast